This is the list of the best-selling certified albums in Finland, according to Musiikkituottajat – IFPI Finland.

See also
List of best-selling albums
List of best-selling singles in Finland
List of best-selling music artists in Finland

References

Finnish music
Finland